Red River Valley is a region in north central North America that is drained by the Red River of the North.

Red River Valley is also a region in south central North America that is drained by the Red River of the South.

Red River Valley may also refer to:
"Red River Valley", a folk song and cowboy music standard of controversial origins
Red River Valley (1936 film), a 1936 American film by B. Reeves Eason
Red River Valley (1941 film), an American film by Joseph Kane
Red River Valley (1997 film), a 1997 Chinese film about the British incursion into Tibet
Red River of the South, a major tributary of the Mississippi and Atchafalaya Rivers
Red River Valley (album), a 1977 album by Slim Whitman

See also
Red River (disambiguation)